Víctor Daniel Bravo de Soto Vergara (born 23 August 1983 in Zaragoza, Aragon) is a Spanish former footballer who played as a midfielder, currently manager of CD Teruel.

References

External links

1983 births
Living people
Spanish footballers
Footballers from Zaragoza
Association football midfielders
La Liga players
Segunda División B players
Tercera División players
CD Calahorra players
SD Huesca footballers
Burgos CF footballers
Atlético Madrid B players
Atlético Madrid footballers
Universidad de Las Palmas CF footballers
Mérida UD footballers
Pontevedra CF footballers
UD Melilla footballers
CD Tenerife players
CD Tudelano footballers
CD Ebro players
CD Teruel footballers
Spanish football managers
Tercera División managers
Segunda Federación managers